Mordellistena bisbimaculata is a beetle in the genus Mordellistena of the family Mordellidae. It was described in 1929 by Pic.

References

bisbimaculata
Beetles described in 1929